Piscator (Latin: fisher) may refer to:

Piscator (surname)
Piscator (Paolozzi), a sculpture by Eduardo Paolozzi at Euston Station, London
 a prehistoric bird genus, see Piscator (bird)
 the Chequered Keelback (Fowlea piscator)
 the Red-footed Booby (Sula piscator)
 the Western Plantain-eater (Crinifer piscator)

Occupational surnames
Latin-language surnames